Ross Muir (born 6 October 1995 in Edinburgh) is a Scottish former professional snooker player. Muir turned professional in 2013 after graduating from event two of the Q School, defeating David Morris 4–0 in the final round. He regularly wears a glove on his bridge hand.

Career

Junior career
Muir had a very successful junior career, winning many titles including the prestigious televised Junior Pot Black at the Crucible Theatre in Sheffield by defeating Jak Jones in the final, the under 14 section of the Lt. Col Walter Rowley OBE Junior Star of the Future, the Scottish National Championship, and captained the Scottish under 16's team to glory in the 2011 Home Internationals Series in Prestatyn, Wales which was the first time Scotland had won the title since 1993. Muir won a place on the main snooker tour for the 2013–14 season after coming through event two of Q School, defeating David Morris 4–0 in the final round.

2013/2014
Muir's first match as a professional was a 5–1 loss against two-time world champion Mark Williams in qualifying for the 2013 Wuxi Classic. His first wins came in qualifying for the next event, the Australian Goldfields Open, by defeating James Cahill and Rod Lawler both 5–1, before losing 5–2 to Liam Highfield. At the Asian Tour event, the Zhangjiagang Open, he defeated world number seven Ding Junhui 4–3 in the last 32 by compiling a break of 80 in the final frame, before being whitewashed 4–0 by Da Hailin in the next round. Muir could not win a match in ranking event qualifying in the rest of the season until the final event, the World Championship, when he beat David Grace 10–6, but then lost 10–5 against Nigel Bond in the subsequent round. Muir finished his debut season on the main tour at world number 113.

2014/2015
Muir failed to qualify for a ranking event during the 2014–15 season. All 128 players on the tour automatically play at the venue stage of the UK Championship and Welsh Open, with Muir being knocked out in the first round 6–5 by Peter Ebdon and 4–1 by Michael White respectively. Muir threatened a comeback in the opening round of the World Championship qualifiers when he rallied from 9–4 down against Cao Yupeng to win four successive frames, but lost the next to be beaten 10–8. Muir would be relegated from the snooker tour as he is finished the season as the world number 99. However, one last 16 and two last 32 finishes in the three Asian Tour events saw him finish 18th on the Asian Order of Merit and claim the first of four places on offer for a new two-year card.

2015/2016
In a match lasting almost seven hours, Muir beat experienced campaigner Alan McManus 6–5 to qualify for the International Championship. It was the first time he played in a ranking event outside of the UK and he lost 6–5 to Thepchaiya Un-Nooh in the first round. Muir stated that he had been using a mind coach to help with the psychological side of the game. He won a match at the venue stage of a ranking event for the first time by edging past Mark King 6–5 at the UK Championship. The deciding frames kept coming for Muir but it was Ben Woollaston who would triumph 6–5 in the second round. He also played in the second round of the Welsh Open because of Jamie Burnett's withdrawal and lost 4–3 to Graeme Dott. Muir whitewashed Burnett 5–0 to qualify for the China Open and was knocked out 5–4 by Robert Milkins in the opening round. In the first round of the World Championship qualifying Muir beat Sean O'Sullivan 10–5, before losing to Ding Junhui 10–1 in the second round.

2016/2017

In the first round of the 2016 UK Championship, Muir beat Joe Swail 6–5, after having trailed 5–2. In a televised match against Ding Junhui in the next round he lost 6–2, having held a narrow 2–1 advantage. He made his first professional maximum break whilst defeating Itaro Santos 5–2 in the qualifying rounds for the German Masters. Muir then met Ali Carter who had also made a 147 on the same day and was edged out 5–4. At the Welsh Open, Muir eliminated Mark Joyce 4–3 and Marco Fu 4–0, before losing 4–1 in the third round to Zhou Yuelong. He reached the last 16 of a ranking event for the first time at the Shoot-Out, which had had its status upgraded this season, and was beaten by Anthony Hamilton. He was thrashed 5–0 by Eden Sharav in the first round of the China Open and just fell short of getting into the top 64 in the world rankings at the end of the season as he was 67th. However, Muir did enough to claim a two-year tour card on the one-year list.

2018/2019
In the 2018 European Masters, Muir reached the last 16 defeating Martin Gould 4–2, Lee Walker 4–2, Gary Wilson 4-2 before losing to Mark Allen 4–3. After defeating defending champion Neil Robertson 4–2 in the second round of the 2018 Scottish Open, Muir revealed he is prone to Retinal migraine issues.

2019/2020
After retirement at the end of the 2018/2019 season, after some improvement in health, he returned and competed in some of the second-tier, Challenge Tour. Now an amateur in status, Muir was able to enter the 2020 European Masters, but lost in the first round of qualifying to Kurt Maflin, 5–2. Muir reached the semi finals of 2020 WSF World Championship in Malta and EBSA European Championship in Portugal.

Personal life
Muir attended Musselburgh Grammar school growing up in Musselburgh, East Lothian. He was a goalkeeper in his childhood and was scouted by Celtic. Muir is also a keen tennis player.

Performance and rankings timeline

Career finals

Pro-am finals: 3 (2 titles)

Amateur finals: 7 (4 titles)

References

External links 

 
Ross Muir at worldsnooker.com

1995 births
Scottish snooker players
Living people
Sportspeople from Edinburgh
Sportspeople from Musselburgh